Albert Tivadar Stahl (born 11 January 1999) is a Romanian professional footballer who plays as a right winger for Liga I side UTA Arad, on loan from Rapid București.

Club career

Early years
While a junior at Atletico Arad, Stahl traveled to English club Manchester City for several trials, however nothing came out of it and later joined UTA Arad. Stahl was promoted from the UTA academy in the summer of 2016, aged 17, and made his senior debut on 20 August in a 3–0 victory to Dacia Unirea Braila for the Liga II championship. On 14 May 2017, he scored his first goal for the club in a 6–0 away win over Academica Clinceni.

In 2018, Stahl traveled to German club Borussia Dortmund for a trial, but nothing concrete has been achieved.

Astra Giurgiu
Pn 19 July 2019, Astra Giurgiu transferred Stahl for an undisclosed fee, with the player penning a four-year deal.

Rapid București
On 30 August 2021, Stahl signed a three-year contract with Romanian club Rapid București.

Career statistics

Club

Honours
Astra Giurgiu
Cupa României runner-up: 2020–21

References

External links
 
 

1999 births
Living people
Sportspeople from Arad, Romania
Romanian people of German descent
Romanian footballers
Association football midfielders
Liga I players
FC Astra Giurgiu players
Liga II players
FC UTA Arad players
FC Rapid București players